War & Leisure is the fourth studio album by American singer Miguel, released on December 1, 2017, through RCA Records. The album was preceded by the release of the first single: "Sky Walker" featuring Travis Scott. The album features further guest appearances from Rick Ross, Quiñ, Kali Uchis, J. Cole and Salaam Remi, with production led by Miguel himself, alongside a variety of contributors including Happy Perez, Steve Mostyn, David Andrew Sitek. Detail, Raphael Saadiq, Jeff Bhasker, Jerry "Wonda" Duplessis and Remi, among others.

Background
He describes the album as having "political undertones, because that’s what life feels like right now". He also announced that a Spanish version of the album is in the works.

Release and promotion
An early version of the song "Come Through and Chill" was uploaded to Miguel's SoundCloud page on June 23, 2016. It did not feature vocals by J. Cole, but ended up on the final version.

The album's lead single, "Sky Walker", featuring American rapper Travis Scott was released on August 24, 2017. The song charted at number 29 on the Billboard Hot 100, making it Miguel's second-highest charting single as a lead artist since 2012's "Adorn". The song was certified platinum by the Recording Industry Association of America (RIAA). It was also certified gold by Music Canada (MC), becoming Miguel's first certified single in that country.

"Told You So", was released on November 3, 2017, as the second single from the album.

Miguel partnered with Revolve Impact and headlined in Schools Not Prisons, along with other partners in late 2017 to spread awareness of the overuse of mass incarceration in California. Footage from his Adelanto stop was used in the music video for "Now". He premiered medleys of "Criminal", "City of Angels", and "Now" on the tour.

Promotional singles
The track "Pineapple Skies" was released on November 17, 2017, as a promotional single from the album.

Critical reception

War & Leisure was met with widespread critical acclaim. At Metacritic, which assigns a normalised rating out of 100 to reviews from mainstream critics, the album has an average score of 81 based on 19 reviews. Reviewing for The Observer, Kitty Empire noted the record's musical daring and scope, while writing that "Miguel's versatility and sureness of touch recall that of [Michael] Jackson in his pomp". Robert Christgau was less enthusiastic in his capsule-review column for Vice, citing "City of Angels" and "Sky Walker" as highlights while finding the album overall to be "more leisurely than the title might make you hope, believe, or fear".

Commercial performance
War & Leisure debuted at number nine on the US Billboard 200 and topped the Billboard US Top R&B/Hip-Hop Albums chart with sales 40,000 album-equivalent units in its first week of release. On January 24, 2019, the album was certified gold by the Recording Industry Association of America (RIAA) for combined sales and album-equivalent units of 500,000 units in the United States.

Track listing

Notes
  signifies a co-producer.
  signifies an additional producer.

Sample credits
 "Pineapple Skies" contains a portion of the composition "Sexual Healing", written by Marvin Gaye, David Ritz and Odell Brown.
 "Come Through and Chill" contains interpolations from "Crushin'", written by James Yancey.
 "Now" contains interpolations from "Where Is My Mind?", written by Charles Thompson.

Personnel
Musicians

 Miguel – lead artist
 Rick Ross – featured artist 
 Travis Scott – featured artist 
 Quiñ – featured artist 
 Kali Uchis – featured artist , background vocals 
 J. Cole – featured artist 
 Salaam Remi – featured artist 

Technical

 Miguel - production , instrumentation , programming , guitar , keyboards , engineering 
 Salaam Remi - production , co-production , bass , drums , keyboards 
 David Andrew Sitek – production , instrumentation 
 Noel "Detail" Fisher – production , engineering 
 Happy Perez – production , instrumentation , programming , guitar , keyboards 
 Steve Mostyn – production , instrumentation 
 Raphael Saadiq – production , instrumentation 
 Jeff Bhasker –  production , instrumentation , programming , guitar , keyboards 
 Jerry "Wonda" Duplessis – production , instrumentation 
 Sidney Swift – co-production 
 Arden "Keyz" Altino – co-production , keyboards 
 Eyal Federman – co-production 
 Sir Dylan – additional production , instrumentation 
 David Davis – bass programming , drums , additional guitars , engineering , additional engineering , mixing 
 Rogét Chahayed – instrumentation , keyboards 
 Ronald "RJ" Kelly – drums 
 Bobby Avila – additional instrumentation 
 Izzy Avila – additional instrumentation 
 Jayme Silverstein – bass 
 Bernard Grobman – additional guitar 
 Brandyn Porter – additional guitar 
 Gleyder "Gee" Disla – engineering , mixing 
 Hotae Alexander Jang – engineering 
 Alex Williams – engineering 
 Serge Tsai – engineering 
 Bo Bodnar – engineering assistance 
 Chad Gordon – engineering assistance 
 Cousin – engineering assistance 
 Joshua Adams – engineering assistance 
 Roberto Moreno – engineering assistance , mixing assistance 
 Chaz Sexton – engineering assistance 
 William Delaney VI – engineering assistance 
 Michael Peterson – engineering assistance , mixing assistance 
 Jaycen Joshua – mixing 
 Bobby Campbell – mixing 
 Mark "Spike" Stent – mixing 
 Christian Plata – mixing 
 Gerry Brown – mixing 
 David Nakaji – mixing assistance 
 Ben Milchev – mixing assistance 
 Scott Moore – mixing assistance 
 Michael Freeman – mixing assistance 
 Geoff Swan – mixing assistance 
 Joseph Valdovinos – mixing assistance 
 Wesley Seidman – mixing assistance 
 Casey Cuayo – mixing assistance 
 Wayne Barrow – associate production
 Mike Bozzi – mastering
 Randy Merrill – mastering 

Miscellaneous

 Miguel - A&R, executive production
 Mark Pitts – A&R, executive production
 Leticia Hilliard – A&R coordination
 Jordan Feldstein – management
 Elena Awbrey – management
 Erwin Gorostiza – creative direction (RCA)
 Brian Roettinger – art direction, design
 Timothy Saccenti – photography
 Van Van Alonso – styling
 Nadia Mohammadpour – grooming
 Heath Mattioli – set design
 Annee Elliot – shoot production

Charts

Weekly charts

Year-end charts

Certifications

References

2017 albums
Miguel (singer) albums
RCA Records albums
Albums produced by Rogét Chahayed